James Thomson (December 18, 1790 – August 10, 1876), served as Mayor of Pittsburgh from 1841 to 1842.

Early life
Thomson was born in Franklin County, Pennsylvania, in 1790 and arrived in Pittsburgh in 1812. From 1812 to 1825, he operated a jewelry store, making and repairing watches on Market Street. In 1825, he began an engine building business.

After Office
After one term as mayor, Mr. Thomson renewed his energies in the engine fabrication industry. His firm also built railroad freight cars.

From 1853 until 1871, Thomson was the engineer for the Pittsburgh Gas Works.  He is buried in Allegheny Cemetery.

See also

List of Mayors of Pittsburgh

Sources
South Pittsburgh Development Corporation
Political Graveyard

1790 births
1876 deaths
Mayors of Pittsburgh
People from Franklin County, Pennsylvania
Burials at Allegheny Cemetery
19th-century American politicians
19th-century American businesspeople